Heteropoda sumatrana is a species of spiders in the genus Heteropoda, family Sparassidae, found in Indonesia (Java and Sumatra). It was first described by Thorell in 1890.

Subspecies 
, the World Spider Catalog accepts two subspecies:
 H. s. javacola Strand, 1907
 H. s. sumatrana
Heteropoda sumatrana montana Thorell, 1890 is treated as a separate species, Heteropoda montana.

References 

Spiders described in 1890
Spiders of Indonesia